Thunbergia atriplicifolia, the Natal primrose, is a species of flowering plant in the family Acanthaceae, native to South Africa and Eswatini. It is a favored browse of the steenbok (Raphicerus campestris).

Etymology 
The genus name Thunbergia is named for Swedish naturalist Carl Thunberg, the father of South African botany. The adjective Atriplicifolia is derived from the Latin, meaning that the species' foliage is similar to that of members of the Atriplex genus.

Description 

Thunbergia atriplicifolia is a perennial, sparsely to densely pubescent shrublet reaching up to 4 cm high. Re-sprouts from a woody base. Leaves are sessile or with petioles up to 4 mm long; blade is narrow to broad ovate with acute to obtuse apex and cordate to cuneate base, about 2.5–6.0 x 1.5–3.5 cm; margins are entire or toothed, usually only with two teeth at the base. Flowers are trumpet-shaped, pale creamy with yellow throat, 4–5 cm in diameter. Seeds are reddish- or greyish-brown with evenly arranged trichomes, 4-6 mm in diameter.

Ecology 
Thunbergia atriplicifolia is a subordinate grassland species where it grows best in both loam and sandy soil.

Distribution 
The species can be found through eastern South Africa.

References

atriplicifolia
Flora of the Cape Provinces
Flora of KwaZulu-Natal
Flora of the Northern Provinces
Flora of Swaziland
Plants described in 1847